Cydia kurokoi, the nut fruit tortrix, is a moth of the  family Tortricidae. It is found in Japan, the Korean Peninsula and eastern China.

The wingspan is about 20 mm. Adults are on wing in August and September. There is one generation per year.

The larvae feed on Castanea seguinii, Castanea mollitissima, Castanea crenata and Quercus acutissima. The larvae feed inside the fruits of chestnut trees and damage them.

External links
Eurasian Tortricidae

Grapholitini
Insects of Korea
Moths described in 1960
Moths of Japan
Taxa named by Hans Georg Amsel